The 1921 College Baseball All-Southern Team consists of baseball players selected at their respective positions after the 1921 NCAA baseball season. Vanderbilt won the SIAA.

All-Southerns

Key
CW = Cliff Wheatley's selection.

References

All-Southern
College Baseball All-Southern Teams